The 2012–13 Washington Wizards season was the 52nd season of the franchise in the National Basketball Association (NBA), and the 40th in the Washington, D.C. area.  Jason Collins was on this team when he became the first active NBA player to publicly come out as gay.

Key dates
 June 28: The 2012 NBA draft took place in Newark, New Jersey.
 July 1: The free agency period begun.

Draft picks

Roster

Pre-season

|- style="background:#fbb;"
| 1
| October 7
| @ Charlotte
| 
| Bradley Beal, Martell Webster (18)
| Chris Singleton (9)
| Shelvin Mack (7)
| Time Warner Cable Arena6,213
| 0–1
|- style="background:#fbb;"
| 2
| October 11
| New York
| 
| Jordan Crawford (17)
| Martell Webster (10)
| Bradley Beal, Jannero Pargo (5)
| Verizon Center9,627
| 0–2
|- style="background:#cfc;"
| 3
| October 13
| @ Cleveland
| 
| Three players (14)
| Shavlik Randolph (9)
| Jordan Crawford (7)
| Quicken Loans Arena10,140
| 1–2
|- style="background:#fbb;"
| 4
| October 15
| @ Brooklyn
| 
| Martell Webster (18)
| Emeka Okafor (6)
| Three players (3)
| Barclays Center14,219
| 1–3
|- style="background:#fbb;"
| 5
| October 17
| @ Toronto
| 
| Trevor Booker (12)
| Earl Barron (8)
| A. J. Price (8)
| Air Canada Centre11,750
| 1–4
|- style="background:#cfc;"
| 6
| October 20
| @ Milwaukee
| 
| Trevor Booker (22)
| Trevor Booker, Emeka Okafor (7)
| A. J. Price (11)
| BMO Harris Bradley Center9,967
| 2–4
|- style="background:#cfc;"
| 7
| October 24
| @ Miami
| 
| Martell Webster (23)
| Jan Veselý (11)
| Jannero Pargo (6)
| Sprint Center16,143
| 3–4
|- style="background:#fbb;"
| 8
| October 26
| @ San Antonio
| 
| A. J. Price, Jan Veselý (13)
| Earl Barron (10)
| Jordan Crawford, Shelvin Mack (4)
| AT&T Center17,842
| 3–5

Regular season

Season standings

Game log

|- bgcolor="ffcccc"
| 1
| October 30
| @ Cleveland
| 
| Jordan Crawford (11)
| Earl Barron (8)
| A.J. Price (6)
| Quicken Loans Arena20,562
| 0–1

|- bgcolor="ffcccc"
| 2
| November 3
| Boston
| 
| Jordan Crawford (21)
| Trevor Booker (10)
| Pargo, Price & Webster (4)
| Verizon Center20,308
| 0-2
|- bgcolor="ffcccc"
| 3
| November 7
| @ Boston
| 
| Beal, Seraphin & Webster (16)
| Kevin Seraphin (9)
| A.J. Price (7)
| TD Garden18,624
| 0-3
|- bgcolor="ffcccc"
| 4
| November 9
| Milwaukee
| 
| Bradley Beal (22)
| Trevor Ariza (8)
| A.J. Price (9)
| Verizon Center14,531
| 0-4
|- bgcolor="ffcccc"
| 5
| November 10
| @ Indiana
| 
| Okafor & Beal (17)
| Emeka Okafor (8)
| A.J. Price (14)
| Conseco Fieldhouse12,036
| 0-5
|- bgcolor="ffcccc"
| 6
| November 13
| @ Charlotte
| 
| Trevor Ariza (19)
| Crawford & Okafor (9)
| A.J. Price (6)
| Time Warner Cable Arena11,139
| 0-6
|- bgcolor="ffcccc"
| 7
| November 14
| @ Dallas
| 
| Jordan Crawford (21)
| Trevor Booker (6)
| Jordan Crawford (7)
| American Airlines Center19,560
| 0-7
|- bgcolor="ffcccc"
| 8
| November 17
| Utah
| 
| Jordan Crawford (20)
| Emeka Okafor (14)
| Jordan Crawford (8)
| Verizon Center16,210
| 0-8
|- bgcolor="ffcccc"
| 9
| November 19
| Indiana
| 
| Bradley Beal (18)
| Trevor Booker (8)
| Shaun Livingston (4)
| Verizon Center14,426
| 0-9
|- bgcolor="ffcccc"
| 10
| November 21
| @ Atlanta
| 
| Kevin Seraphin (21)
| Trevor Ariza (15)
| A.J. Price (7)
| Philips Arena11,338
| 0-10
|- bgcolor="ffcccc"
| 11
| November 24
| Charlotte
| 
| Martell Webster (21)
| Chris Singleton (12)
| Jordan Crawford (6)
| Verizon Center13,077
| 0-11
|- bgcolor="ffcccc"
| 12
| November 26
| San Antonio
| 
| Jordan Crawford (19)
| Kevin Seraphin (7)
| A.J. Price (7)
| Verizon Center13,879
| 0-12
|- style="background:#cfc;"
| 13
| November 28
| Portland
| 
| Jordan Crawford (19)
| Kevin Seraphin (10)
| A.J. Price (6)
| Verizon Center14,114
| 1-12
|- bgcolor="ffcccc"
| 14
| November 30
| @ New York
| 
| Jordan Crawford (17)
| Kevin Seraphin (10)
| Jordan Crawford (4)
| Madison Square Garden19,033
| 1-13

|- style="background:#cfc;"
| 15
| December 4
| Miami
| 
| Jordan Crawford (22)
| Kevin Seraphin (10)
| Jordan Crawford (6)
| Verizon Center17,761
| 2-13
|- bgcolor="ffcccc"
| 16
| December 7
| @ Atlanta
| 
| Kevin Seraphin (19)
| Kevin Seraphin (7)
| A.J. Price (6)
| Philips Arena13,067
| 2-14
|- bgcolor="ffcccc"
| 17
| December 8
| Golden State
| 
| Jordan Crawford (22)
| Jordan Crawford (7)
| Jordan Crawford (8)
| Verizon Center15,176
| 2-15
|- bgcolor="ccffcc"
| 18
| December 11
| @ New Orleans
| 
| Jordan Crawford (26)
| Nenê (10)
| Beal & Crawford (20)
| New Orleans Arena10,076
| 3-15
|- bgcolor="ffcccc"
| 19
| December 12
| @ Houston
| 
| Bradley Beal (20)
| Nenê (9)
| Bradley Beal (6)
| Toyota Center13,351
| 3-16
|- bgcolor="ffcccc"
| 20
| December 14
| L. A. Lakers
| 
| Cartier Martin (21)
| Martin, Nenê, & Seraphin (8)
| Jordan Crawford (6)
| Verizon Center20,308
| 3–17
|- bgcolor="ffcccc"
| 21
| December 15
| @ Miami
| 
| Bradley Beal (19)
| Emeka Okafor (10)
| Jordan Crawford (6)
| American Airlines Arena19,724
| 3-18
|- bgcolor="ffcccc"
| 22
| December 18
| Atlanta
| 
| Jordan Crawford (27)
| Earl Barron (14)
| Jordan Crawford (11)
| Verizon Center15,123
| 3-19
|- bgcolor="ffcccc"
| 23
| December 19
| @ Orlando
| 
| Nenê (20)
| Emeka Okafor (12)
| Jordan Crawford (6)
| Amway Center16,893
| 3-20
|- bgcolor="ffcccc"
| 24
| December 21
| @ Detroit
| 
| Jordan Crawford (20)
| Martell Webster (9)
| Jordan Crawford (7)
| The Palace of Auburn Hills13,489
| 3-21
|- bgcolor="ffcccc"
| 25
| December 22
| Detroit
| 
| Jordan Crawford (21)
| Emeka Okafor (14)
| Jordan Crawford (6)
| Verizon Center13,104
| 3-22
|- bgcolor="ffcccc"
| 26
| December 26
| Cleveland
| 
| Crawford & Okafor (17)
| Okafor & Webster (10)
| Shelvin Mack (7)
| Verizon Center13,846
| 3-23
|- bgcolor="ccffcc"
| 27
| December 28
| Orlando
| 
| Jordan Crawford (27)
| Nenê & Okafor (11)
| Crawford & Temple (6)
| Verizon Center15,789
| 4-23
|- bgcolor="ffcccc"
| 28
| December 29
| @ Chicago
| 
| Bradley Beal (14)
| Emeka Okafor (18)
| Mack & Temple (5)
| United Center22,447
| 4-24

|- bgcolor="ffcccc"
| 29
| January 1
| Dallas
| 
| Bradley Beal (22)
| Emeka Okafor (11)
| Shelvin Mack (6)
| Verizon Center14,456
| 4-25
|- bgcolor="ffcccc"
| 30
| January 2
| @ Indiana
| 
| Jordan Crawford (20)
| Okafor & Seraphin (9)
| Crawford & Temple (7)
| Conseco Fieldhouse11,182
| 4-26
|- bgcolor="ffcccc"
| 31
| January 4
| Brooklyn
| 
| Bradley Beal (24)
| Okafor & Temple (7)
| Garrett Temple (11)
| Verizon Center16,006
| 4-27
|- bgcolor="ffcccc"
| 32
| January 6
| @ Miami
| 
| Kevin Seraphin (14)
| Emeka Okafor (9)
| Garrett Temple (7)
| American Airlines Arena20,228
| 4-28
|- bgcolor="ccffcc"
| 33
| January 7
| Oklahoma City
| 
| Beal & Webster (22)
| Emeka Okafor (12)
| A.J. Price (5)
| Verizon Center16,917
| 5-28
|- bgcolor="ccffcc"
| 34
| January 12
| Atlanta
| 
| Beal & Price (16)
| Nenê & Okafor (10)
| John Wall (4)
| Verizon Center15,331
| 6-28
|- bgcolor="ccffcc"
| 35
| January 14
| Orlando
| 
| Emeka Okafor (19)
| Emeka Okafor (11)
| Wall & Price (6)
| Verizon Center14,648
| 7-28
|- bgcolor="ffcccc"
| 36
| January 16
| @ Sacramento
| 
| Bradley Beal (26)
| Nenê & Webster (9)
| John Wall (10)
| Power Balance Pavilion11,611
| 7-29
|- bgcolor="ccffcc"
| 37
| January 18
| @ Denver
| 
| Bradley Beal (23)
| Trevor Booker (8)
| John Wall (12)
| Pepsi Center16,523
| 8-29
|- bgcolor="ffcccc"
| 38
| January 19
| @ L. A. Clippers
| 
| John Wall (24)
| Emeka Okafor (12)
| John Wall (6)
| Staples Center19,188
| 8-30
|- bgcolor="ccffcc"
| 39
| January 21
| @ Portland
| 
| Nenê & Webster (24)
| Emeka Okafor (13)
| Martell Webster (6)
| Rose Garden17,366
| 9-30
|- bgcolor="ffcccc"
| 40
| January 23
| @ Utah
| 
| Martell Webster (15)
| Emeka Okafor (17)
| John Wall (8)
| EnergySolutions Arena18,158
| 9-31
|- bgcolor="ccffcc"
| 41
| January 25
| Minnesota
| 
| Jordan Crawford (19)
| Emeka Okafor (8)
| John Wall (5)
| Verizon Center14,095
| 10-31
|- bgcolor="ccffcc"
| 42
| January 26
| Chicago
| 
| Nenê (16)
| Emeka Okafor (16)
| John Wall (7)
| Verizon Center20,308
| 11-31
|- bgcolor="ffcccc"
| 43
| January 28
| Sacramento
| 
| Emeka Okafor (23)
| Emeka Okafor (15)
| John Wall (6)
| Verizon Center13,422
| 11-32
|- bgcolor="ffcccc"
| 44
| January 30
| @ Philadelphia
| 
| Nenê (16)
| Emeka Okafor (17)
| John Wall (6)
| Wells Fargo Center15,101
|11-33

|- bgcolor="ffcccc"
| 45
| February 1
| @ Memphis
| 
| Nenê (14)
| Emeka Okafor (10)
| Wall & Nenê (6)
| FedExForum15,017
| 11-34
|- bgcolor="ffcccc"
| 46
| February 2
| @ San Antonio
| 
| John Wall (21)
| Emeka Okafor (9)
| John Wall (9)
| AT&T Center18,581
| 11-35
|- bgcolor="ccffcc"
| 47
| February 4
| L. A. Clippers
| 
| Martell Webster (21)
| Emeka Okafor (14)
| John Wall (8)
| Verizon Center16,246
| 12-35
|- bgcolor="ccffcc"
| 48
| February 6
| New York
| 
| John Wall (21)
| Nenê (10)
| John Wall (9)
| Verizon Center18,263
| 13-35
|- bgcolor="ccffcc"
| 49
| February 8
| Brooklyn
| 
| Nenê (20)
| Nenê (11)
| John Wall (9)
| Verizon Center19,614
| 14-35
|- bgcolor="ccffcc"
| 50
| February 11
| @ Milwaukee
| 
| Bradley Beal (28)
| Nenê (13)
| John Wall (10)
| Bradley Center13,842
| 15-35
|- bgcolor="ffcccc"
| 51
| February 13
| @ Detroit
| 
| Emeka Okafor (20)
| Emeka Okafor (9)
| John Wall (9)
| The Palace of Auburn Hills11,095
| 15-36
|- align="center"
|colspan="9" bgcolor="#bbcaff"|All-Star Break
|- bgcolor="ffcccc"
| 52
| February 19
| Toronto
| 
| Bradley Beal (25)
| Emeka Okafor (9)
| John Wall (6)
| Verizon Center13,923
| 15-37
|- bgcolor="ccffcc"
| 53
| February 22
| Denver
| 
| Emeka Okafor (17)
| Emeka Okafor (13)
| John Wall (10)
| Verizon Center16,527
| 16-37
|- bgcolor="ccffcc"
| 54
| February 23
| Houston
| 
| Bradley Beal (21)
| Emeka Okafor (11)
| John Wall (11)
| Verizon Center20,308
| 17-37
|- bgcolor="ccffcc"
| 55
| February 25
| @ Toronto
| 
| Bradley Beal (20)
| Emeka Okafor (13)
| John Wall (7)
| Air Canada Centre16,705
|18-37
|- bgcolor="ffcccc"
| 56
| February 27
| Detroit
| 
| Trevor Ariza (22)
| Chris Singleton (8)
| A.J. Price (8)
| Verizon Center14,298
| 18-38

|- bgcolor="ffcccc"
| 57
| March 1
| New York
| 
| Bradley Beal (29)
| Bradley Beal (11)
| John Wall (6)
| Verizon Center20,308
| 18-39
|- bgcolor="ccffcc"
| 58
| March 3
| Philadelphia
| 
| Martell Webster (16)
| Emeka Okafor (16)
| John Wall (6)
| Verizon Center17,370
| 19-39
|- bgcolor="ffcccc"
| 59
| March 6
| @ Minnesota
| 
| John Wall (19)
| Emeka Okafor (14)
| John Wall (7)
| Target Center13,233
| 19-40
|- bgcolor="ffcccc"
| 60
| March 8
| @ Brooklyn
| 
| John Wall (16)
| Emeka Okafor (9)
| A.J. Price (4)
| Barclays Center17,732
| 19-41
|- bgcolor="ccffcc"
| 61
| March 9
| Charlotte
| 
| Trevor Ariza (26)
| Emeka Okafor (10)
| John Wall (6)
| Verizon Center16,357
| 20-41
|- bgcolor="ffcccc"
| 62
| March 12
| @ Cleveland
| 
| John Wall (27)
| Emeka Okafor (11)
| John Wall (14)
| Quicken Loans Arena14,689
| 20-42
|- bgcolor="ccffcc"
| 63
| March 13
| Milwaukee
| 
| John Wall (23)
| Nenê (13)
| John Wall (10)
| Verizon Center14,506
| 21-42
|- bgcolor="ccffcc"
| 64
| March 15
| New Orleans
| 
| John Wall (29)
| Trevor Booker (13)
| John Wall (9)
| Verizon Center14,942
| 22-42
|- bgcolor="ccffcc"
| 65
| March 16
| Phoenix
| 
| Martell Webster (34)
| Emeka Okafor (10)
| John Wall (11)
| Verizon Center16,882
| 23-42
|- bgcolor="ffcccc"
| 66
| March 18
| @ Charlotte
| 
| John Wall (25)
| Emeka Okafor (9)
| Nenê (7)
| Time Warner Cable Arena10,141
| 23-43
|- bgcolor="ccffcc"
| 67
| March 20
| @ Phoenix
| 
| John Wall (19)
| Nenê (8)
| John Wall (8)
| US Airways Center14,819
| 24-43
|- bgcolor="ccffcc"
| 68
| March 22
| @ L. A. Lakers
| 
| Trevor Ariza (25)
| Garrett Temple (6)
| John Wall (16)
| Staples Center18,997
| 25-43
|- bgcolor="ffcccc"
| 69
| March 23
| @ Golden State
| 
| Cartier Martin (23)
| Kevin Seraphin (6)
| Garrett Temple (6)
| Oracle Arena19,596
| 25-44
|- bgcolor="ccffcc"
| 70
| March 25
| Memphis
| 
| John Wall (47)
| Emeka Okafor (9)
| John Wall (8)
| Verizon Center17,868
| 26-44
|- bgcolor="ffcccc"
| 71
| March 27
| @ Oklahoma City
| 
| John Wall (18)
| Emeka Okafor (10)
| John Wall (12)
| Chesapeake Energy Arena18,203
| 26-45
|- bgcolor="ffcccc"
| 72
| March 29
| @ Orlando
| 
| John Wall (35)
| Emeka Okafor (13)
| Martell Webster &  Garrett Temple (3)
| Amway Center17,998
| 26-46
|- bgcolor="ccffcc"
| 73
| March 31
| Toronto
| 
| Bradley Beal (24)
| Emeka Okafor (10)
| John Wall (10)
| Verizon Center14,360
| 27-46

|- bgcolor="ccffcc"
| 74
| April 2
| Chicago
| 
| John Wall (27)
| Emeka Okafor (9)
| John Wall (9)
| Verizon Center17,319
| 28-46
|- bgcolor="ffcccc"
| 75
| April 3
| @ Toronto
| 
| John Wall (20)
| Emeka Okafor (8)
| John Wall (5)
| Air Canada Centre15,783
| 28-47
|- bgcolor="ccffcc"
| 76
| April 6
| Indiana
| 
| John Wall (37)
| Emeka Okafor (9)
| John Wall (5)
| Verizon Center19,360
| 29-47
|- bgcolor="ffcccc"
| 77
| April 7
| @ Boston
| 
| John Wall (16)
| Emeka Okafor (9)
| John Wall (10)
| TD Garden18,624
| 29-48
|- bgcolor="ffcccc"
| 78
| April 9
| @ New York
| 
| John Wall (33)
| Emeka Okafor (8)
| Nenê (5)
| Madison Square Garden19,033
| 29-49
|- bgcolor="ffcccc"
| 79
| April 10
| Miami
| 
| A.J. Price (23)
| John Wall (9)
| John Wall (11)
| Verizon Center20,308
| 29-50
|- bgcolor="ffcccc"
| 80
| April 12
| Philadelphia
| 
| John Wall (24)
| Nenê (10)
| John Wall (7)
| Verizon Center18,476
| 29-51
|- bgcolor="ffcccc"
| 81
| April 15
| @ Brooklyn
| 
| John Wall (18)
| Trevor Booker (13)
| John Wall (12)
| Barclays Center16,774
| 29-52
|- bgcolor="ffcccc"
| 82
| April 17
| @ Chicago
| 
| A.J. Price (24)
| Kevin Seraphin (9)
| Garrett Temple (5)
| United Center22421
| 29-53

Injuries and surgeries
On September 28, 2012, the Wizards announced that John Wall would be sidelined for about eight weeks after being diagnosed with the early stages of what could become a stress fracture in his left knee. No surgery was required, but Wall had to begin rehabilitation immediately.

Transactions

Overview

Trades

Free agents

References

Washington Wizards seasons
Washington Wizards
Wash
Wash